Mark Henry Belanger (June 8, 1944 – October 6, 1998), nicknamed "The Blade," was an American professional baseball player and coach. He played 18 seasons in Major League Baseball as a shortstop from  through , most notably as a member of the Baltimore Orioles dynasty that won six American League East division titles, five American League pennants, and two World Series championships between 1966 and 1979. 

A defensive standout, Belanger won eight Gold Glove Awards between 1969 and 1978, leading the American League in assists and fielding percentage three times each; he retired with the highest career fielding average by an AL shortstop (.977). In defensive Wins Above Replacement (WAR), Belanger is tied with Ozzie Smith and Joe Tinker for most times as league leader with six.  Belanger set franchise records for career games, assists, and double plays as a shortstop, all of which were later broken by Cal Ripken Jr. After his playing career, he became an official with the Major League Baseball Players Association. In 1983, Belanger was inducted into the Baltimore Orioles Hall of Fame.

Early life
Belanger was born in Pittsfield, Massachusetts, and attended Pittsfield High School, where he played baseball and basketball. On the basketball court, he became the school's first 1,000-point scorer.

Career
Belanger took over as the Orioles' regular shortstop in late  and held the position for more than a decade. He hit his first Major League home run at Yankee Stadium on May 14, 1967, off Yankees' ace Mel Stottlemyre. Belanger was nicknamed "The Blade" because of his tall and narrow frame—6'1" (1.85 m) and 170 pounds (77 kg). Despite his reputation as one of the best fielding shortstops in Major League history, Belanger was known as a poor hitter. In 1970, he finished last among qualifying AL players in all three Triple Crown categories. In his 18 seasons in the Major Leagues, Belanger hit only 20 home runs and had a lifetime batting average of .228, only topping the .230 mark over a full season three times. His .228 lifetime batting average is the third-lowest of any Major League player with more than 5,000 career at bats, ahead of only George McBride (.218) and Ed Brinkman (.224). Belanger also finished his career with the seventh-lowest batting average of any non-catcher with at least 2,500 at bats since 1920. Despite his famously poor hitting, Belanger had substantial success against some of the best pitchers of his era, including Bert Blyleven, Nolan Ryan and Tommy John.

Belanger was a flashy fielder and won eight AL Gold Gloves (1969, 1971, and 1973–78). He was also named to the All-Star team in 1976. Because Brooks Robinson won the AL Gold Glove at third base each season during the 1960–1975 stretch, the left side of the Orioles' infield was seemingly impenetrable.

He hit a rare home run in the first American League Championship Series game ever played in 1969, and after uncharacteristically hitting .333 in the 1970 ALCS, his contributions led to the Orioles' 1970 World Series victory, the team's second title in five years. During the series, he caught a line drive to end a 4–3 victory in Game 1 with the tying run on first base, and he had an assist to end Game 3. Belanger played in six ALCS series and set league playoff records for career games, putouts, assists, total chances, and double plays by a shortstop. (All these records were broken between 1998 and 2002 by Omar Vizquel and Derek Jeter.)

On June 3, 1977, Belanger was part of what sportswriter Fred Rothenberg called "one of the strangest triple plays in baseball history." With the bases loaded for the Royals in the ninth inning, and Kansas City down 7–5, John Wathan hit a fly ball to right field that Pat Kelly caught for the first out. All the runners tagged to advance a base, but Kelly threw to Belanger, who caught Freddie Patek in a rundown between first and second base and tagged him out. While this was going on, Dave Nelson, who had successfully advanced to third base, attempted to score. Upon tagging out Patek, Belanger ran towards the third base line and caught up with Nelson ten feet from home plate, tagging him out to complete the triple play and end the game.

Belanger was granted free agency in —perhaps in response to his public criticism of manager Earl Weaver—and signed with the Los Angeles Dodgers for the  season; he retired at the end of the season.

Following Belanger's departure from the Orioles, former teammate Rich Dauer said, "Anyone would miss Mark Belanger. You're talking about the greatest shortstop in the world. He never put you in a bad position with his double-play throws...He'd put you where you should be to make the play... I never had to think out there. If there was any question in my mind, I'd look at Blade, and he'd have a finger out, pointing which way I should move."

Later life
Belanger served as the Orioles' union representative for several years. He was one of the four players who led negotiations during the 1981 strike.

After Belanger's retirement as an active player (and until his death), he was employed by the MLB Players Association as a liaison to its membership.

Belanger and his first wife, Daryl, had two homes—in Timonium, Maryland and Key Biscayne, Florida—and had two sons, Richard and Robert. He married his second wife, Virginia French, who survives him, in early 1997.

A long-time cigarette smoker, Belanger was diagnosed with lung cancer in the late 1990s and died in New York City at the age of 54. He was survived by his second wife, Virginia, sons Richard and Robert, his parents, and three siblings. He is interred in St. Joseph Cemetery in Pittsfield, Massachusetts.

See also

List of Major League Baseball career stolen bases leaders
List of Gold Glove middle infield duos

References

External links

Retrosheet
 
 

1944 births
1998 deaths
American League All-Stars
Baltimore Orioles players
Deaths from lung cancer in New York (state)
Gold Glove Award winners
Los Angeles Dodgers players
Baseball players from Massachusetts
Burials in Massachusetts
Major League Baseball shortstops
Pittsfield High School alumni
Sportspeople from Pittsfield, Massachusetts
Bluefield Orioles players
Elmira Pioneers players
Aberdeen Pheasants players
Rochester Red Wings players
People from Timonium, Maryland
People from Key Biscayne, Florida